Green Blood is a Japanese manga series written and illustrated by Masasumi Kakizaki. It was serialized in Kodansha's seinen manga magazine Weekly Young Magazine from June 2011 to May 2013, with its chapters published in five tankōbon volumes.

Publication
Green Blood is written and illustrated by Masasumi Kakizaki. It was serialized in Kodansha's Weekly Young Magazine from June 13, 2011 to May 13, 2013. Kodansha compiled its chapters in five tankōbon volumes, released from November 4, 2011 to July 5, 2013.

The manga has been licensed in France by Ki-oon, in Italy by Panini Comics, in Spain by Milky Way, in Poland by Japonica Polonica Fantastica and in Brazil by JBC.

Volume list

References

External links
 

Action anime and manga
Kodansha manga
Seinen manga
Western (genre) anime and manga